Colton Simpson (born ) is a former Crip who is serving a 126-year prison sentence under California's three-strikes law.

He is the author of Inside the Crips: Life Inside L.A.'s Most Notorious Gang, a book detailing his life in the gang. Back in 1998 he was charged with attempted murder, and sentenced 40 years in prison.

His prior convictions include a 1986 conviction for robbery and attempted murder.

Simpson was arrested in March 2003, two days after a jewel robbery in Temecula, California. Rental documents linked him to the getaway car used in the robbery, and he was identified as the driver by two police officers who had pursued the car. A trial scheduled for August 2005 was postponed after Simpson's attorney removed himself from the case. In 2007, Simpson was found guilty of robbery, burglary and grand theft, and sentenced under California's three-strikes law.

Inside the Crips was published in 2005.

References

Date of birth missing (living people)
1960s births
Living people
American people convicted of attempted murder
American prisoners sentenced to life imprisonment
American people convicted of burglary
American robbers
Criminals from California
Crips
Organized crime memoirists
American people convicted of theft
Prisoners sentenced to life imprisonment by California
American memoirists
African-American non-fiction writers
American non-fiction writers
21st-century African-American people
20th-century African-American people